Ted McKeever is an American artist known for his work in the comic book industry. A master of pen-and-ink, McKeever has also fully painted many comics. He is known for his distinct graphic style and "bold, angular lines, which gives his work a fantastic, almost Kafka-esque edge."

McKeever's first professional comics work appeared in 1986 with Transit, published by Vortex Comics. His following thirty years in the industry also included such titles as Eddy Current, Plastic Forks, Metropol, Industrial Gothic, Junk Culture, and Faith. Over the years, McKeever collaborated with other creators, including Dave Gibbons, Peter Milligan, Jean-Marc Lofficier, and Rachel Pollack. McKeever cites editors Archie Goodwin, Lou Stathis, Karen Berger, and Jim Valentino as being important contributors to his career.

Life and career 
McKeever came to comics after working for some years in the journalism field, first for ABC television as a courtroom artist, and then at the Miami Herald as an editorial artist.

In the mid-1980s, at the Atlanta Fantasy Fair, McKeever showed editor Archie Goodwin some preliminary pages for Transit; Goodwin encouraged him to show the work to as many publishers as possible. As a result, the project was picked up by Vortex Comics and editor Lou Stathis. McKeever's next project, Eddy Current, was published by the short-lived publisher Mad Dog Graphics in 1987–1988.

McKeever's next series, Plastic Forks, was originally set for publication by Comico, but the company went out of business before publishing a single issue. McKeever showed Archie Goodwin, now head of the Marvel Comics creator-owned imprint Epic Comics, some original art pages from the first issue of Plastic Forks, which Goodwin immediately approved, and added it to the Epic line-up. Metropol followed, also published by Epic in 1991–1992. McKeever left Epic after his epilogue series, Metropol A.D. (1993) was given new editors partway through it's production.

In 1994, McKeever connected with DC Vertigo Executive Editor Karen Berger, first working on The Extremist with writer Peter Milligan. McKeever then took over as artist of Doom Patrol, working with writer Rachel Pollack; McKeever drew most of the last 13 issues before the series was canceled. Other Vertigo projects followed — most edited by Lou Stathis, who had moved to Vertigo (but who died in 1997) — including Industrial Gothic (1995), Junk Culture (1997), Toxic Gumbo (with writer Lydia Lunch, 1998), and Faith (1999–2000).

In the late 1990s/early 2000s, McKeever worked with writers Randy Lofficier & Jean-Marc Lofficier on a trilogy of DC Elseworlds one-shots based on German Expressionist cinema — Superman's Metropolis (1997), Batman: Nosferatu (1999), and Wonder Woman: The Blue Amazon (2003).

In 2010 McKeever began producing solo projects for Jim Valentino's Shadowline imprint at Image Comics. Starting with Meta4, McKeever then continued between the years 2011 through 2015, where he produced the series Mondo, Miniature Jesus, The Superannuated Man, and finally Pencil Head in 2016, before he walked away from the comics industry for good.

Awards 
 (nomination) 1992 UK Comic Art Award for Best Writer/Artist 
 (nomination) 1997 Eisner Award for Best Short Story for "Perpetual Mourning" in Batman Black and White #1
 2007 International Horror Guild Award for Illustrated Narrative for The Nightmare Factory)

Bibliography (selected)

Creator series 
 Transit (Vortex Comics, 1986)
 Eddy Current (Mad Dog Graphics, 1987–1988)
 Plastic Forks (Epic Comics, 1989-1990)
 Metropol (Epic Comics, 1991–1992)
 Metropol A.D. (Epic Comics, 1993)
 Industrial Gothic (Vertigo, 1995)
 Junk Culture (Vertigo, 1997)
 Faith (Vertigo, 1999–2000)
 Meta4 (Shadowline, 2010–2011)
 Mondo (Shadowline, 2010–2012)
 Miniature Jesus (Shadowline, 2013)
 The Superannuated Man (Shadowline, 2014–2015)
 Pencil Head (Shadowline, 2016)

Other comics work 
 untitled one-pager in Strip AIDS U.S.A. (Last Gasp, 1988)
 (with writer Dave Gibbons) "Survivor," in A1 #1 (Atomeka Press, 1989)
 "The Talk of Creatures," in A1 #2 (Atomeka Press, 1989)
 (with writer Peter Milligan) The Extremist (Vertigo, 1993)
 (with writer Rachel Pollack) Doom Patrol #75–79, 81–82, 84–87 (Vertigo, 1994–1995)
 "Perpetual Mourning" in Batman Black and White #1 (DC Comics, 1996)
 (with writers Randy Lofficier, & Jean-Marc Lofficier) Superman's Metropolis (DC Elseworlds, 1997)
 (with writer Lydia Lunch) Toxic Gumbo (Vertigo, 1998)
 (with writers Randy Lofficier & Jean-Marc Lofficier) Batman: Nosferatu (DC Elseworlds, 1999)
 "A Life Less Empty," in The Matrix Comics Series 1 (WB Publishing, 1999)
 "Grave Wisdom," in Flinch #14 (Vertigo, 2000)
 "The King of Never Return," in The Matrix Comics Series 2 (WB Publishing, 2000)
 (with writer Keron Grant) "Day In... Day Out", in The Matrix Comics Series 2 (WB Publishing, 2000)
 "Memories of Green," in Marvel Knights Double Shot (Marvel Knights, 2002)
 (with writer Brian Michael Bendis) Ultimate Marvel Team-Up #12–13 (Marvel Comics, 2002)
 Spider-Man's Tangled Web #18 (Marvel Comics, 2002)
 (with writers Randy Lofficier & Jean-Marc Lofficier) Wonder Woman: The Blue Amazon (DC Elseworlds, 2003)
 (with writer Joe Kelly) Enginehead (DC, 2004)
 (with writer Steve Niles ) Little Book of Horror: War of the Worlds (IDW Publishing, 2005)
 (with writer F. Paul Wilson) "Cuts," in Doomed #1 (IDW, 2006)
 (with writer Joe Harris) "Dr. Locrian's Asylum," The Nightmare Factory (Fox Atomic Comics, 2007)
 "Morgue Amore," in Legion of Monsters #1 (Marvel Comics, 2007)
 (inspired by Tori Amos' Under the Pink) "Past The Mission," Comic Book Tattoo (Image Comics, 2008)
 "Modern Primitive," in Rampaging Wolverine #1 (Marvel Comics, 2009)
 "Breakfast All Day," in Astonishing Tales #1 (Marvel Comics, 2009)
 "So This Is How It Feels...," in The Mystic Hands of Dr. Strange #1 (Marvel Comics, 2010)
 "Bonebomb Babylon," in Savage Axe of Ares #1 (Marvel Comics, 2010)

References

Living people
21st-century American painters
Painters from New York City
American comics artists